Xyleco is a privately held scientific research and manufacturing company in Wakefield, Massachusetts. Xyleco is developing a process to convert biomass into useful products, including cellulosic ethanol. The board of directors includes Steven Chu and George Shultz.  Employee reviews of Xyleco are mixed.  Some workers are extremely optimistic as the company grows, while other workers find management secretive and manipulative.

Xyleco's process involves using ionizing radiation from an electron particle accelerator to break apart cellulose molecules.  Accelerators are energy-intensive, but treatment times are short.

History
The company was started by  Marshall Medoff, an 81-year old without a formal science education.  He got his inspiration by spending time at Walden Pond, and studying research papers in a storage facility for 15 years.  During that time, he was granted over 300 patents.  Several 2002 patents were for  plastic-cellulose-fiber composites expected to be stronger than ordinary plastic based on resins and wood fiber.  In 2004, Rubbermaid agreed to work with Xyleco to develop a material that would be stronger and cheaper than current materials.

In 2009, Medoff hired his first employee, Craig Masterman, an MIT graduate in chemistry.  Using $45 million from investors, they built a testing laboratory in Wakefield, Massachusetts, in March 2015.

See also
 Cellulosic ethanol
 Cellulosic ethanol commercialization

References

Biomass
Sustainable energy
Particle accelerators